Lophocampa pseudomaculata is a moth of the family Erebidae. It was described by Walter Rothschild in 1910. It is found in Brazil.

References

 Natural History Museum Lepidoptera generic names catalog

pseudomaculata
Moths described in 1910